The 1910–11 season was the second year of football played by Dundee Hibernian and their first ever season in the Scottish Football League, and covers the period from 1 July 1910 to 30 June 1911.

Match results
Dundee Hibernian played a total of 22 matches during the 1910–11 season.

Legend

All results are written with Dundee Hibernian's score first.
Own goals in italics

Second Division

References

Dundee United F.C. seasons
Dundee Hibernian